PTS or Pts may refer to:

Businesses and organisations

Businesses
 Pacific Telemanagement Services, an American payphone operator
 Public Television Service, public broadcaster in Taiwan
 Swedish Post and Telecom Authority (Swedish: Post- och telestyrelsen, PTS)

Politics
 São Toméan Workers Party (Portuguese: Partido Trabalhista Santomense, PTS) 
Socialist Workers' Party (Argentina) (Spanish: Partido de los Trabajadores Socialistas, PTS)

Schools and colleges
 Palmer Trinity School, Palmetto Bay, Florida, U.S.
 Pittsburgh Theological Seminary, Pennsylvania, U.S.
 Princeton Theological Seminary, Princeton, New Jersey, U.S.

Other organisations
 Protestant Truth Society, a British religious organisation

Science, technology and mathematics

Biology and medicine
 PTS (gene), 6-pyruvoyltetrahydropterin synthase, a human gene
 Peroxisomal targeting signal, in biochemical protein targeting
 PEP group translocation, or phosphotransferase system, a method used by bacteria for sugar uptake 
 Parsonage–Turner syndrome, a medical condition
 Post-thrombotic syndrome, a medical condition
 Post-traumatic stress disorder, a medical condition

Computing
 Pay to surf, an early internet business model
 Phoronix Test Suite, benchmark software
 Presentation time stamp, metadata in MPEG video or other streams
 Pseudoterminal Slave

Other uses in science, technology and mathematics
 Pure type system in mathematical logic
 PTS (amphibious vehicle), a Soviet vehicle
 Probability of Technical Success in Clinical Trials

Other uses
 PTS, abbreviation for a points decision in combat sports
 Pts or ₧, Peseta (disambiguation), a number of currencies 
 pts, abbreviation for the plural of pint, a unit of capacity
 Personal Track Safety, a British system of safer working practices on railways
 Potential Trouble Source, in Scientology
 Kind Space, formerly Pink Triangle Services, an LGBT community centre in Ottawa, Canada
 PTS, abbreviation for "Paint to Sample" at Porsche, a special option to allow the customer to select the paint color of their car out of a list of special approved paint samples.

See also
Point (typography)